Nutrient deficiency may refer to:

Malnutrition, a condition in animals that results from a diet deficient in calories and/or essential nutrients
Micronutrient deficiency, a lack of one or more of the micronutrients required for plant or animal health
Avitaminosis, any disease caused by chronic or long-term vitamin deficiency or caused by a defect in metabolic conversion
Mineral deficiency, a lack of dietary minerals that are needed for an organism's proper health